"Comin Out Strong" is a song by American rapper Future, featuring Canadian singer the Weeknd, from his sixth studio album Hndrxx (2017). The artists co-wrote the song with Kevin Vincent, Noel Fisher, Henry Walter and Ahmad Balshe.  It was produced by High Klassified and Cirkut. It is the fourth overall collaboration between the two artists.

Kodak Black called Future on a live Instagram feed in August 2017, asking about some unclear lyrics in the song. Future responded that the line is "I only feel alive when I take it", as in taking pills.

Music video
The music video for "Comin Out Strong"  was released exclusively to Apple Music on June 5, 2017. It was shot in the abandoned Lower Bay Station in Toronto, Canada.

Commercial performance
"Comin Out Strong'" peaked at number 48 on the Billboard Hot 100 on the date ending March 18, 2017. The song was certified Platinum by the Recording Industry Association of America (RIAA) for combined sales and streaming equivalent units of over 1,000,000 units in the United States.

Charts

Certifications

References 

Future (rapper) songs
The Weeknd songs
2017 songs
Songs written by Belly (rapper)
Songs written by Future (rapper)
Songs written by the Weeknd
Songs written by Detail (record producer)
Songs written by Cirkut (record producer)
Song recordings produced by Cirkut (record producer)